Southern Accents is the sixth studio album by Tom Petty and the Heartbreakers, released on March 26, 1985, through MCA Records. The album's lead single, "Don't Come Around Here No More", co-written by Dave Stewart of Eurythmics, peaked at number 13 on the Billboard Hot 100. The song "Southern Accents" was later covered by Johnny Cash for his Unchained album in 1996.

Background

Originally conceived as a concept album, the theme of Southern Accents became somewhat murky with the inclusion of three songs co-written by Stewart, and several others originally planned for the album left off. Songs cut from the track list include "Trailer", "Crackin' Up" (a Nick Lowe cover), "Big Boss Man" (a Jimmy Reed cover), "The Image of Me" (a Conway Twitty cover), "Walkin' from the Fire", and "The Apartment Song". The first two were released as B-sides, while the two remaining covers (and a demo version of "The Apartment Song") were later released on the Playback box set. A studio version of "The Apartment Song" appeared on Petty's first solo album, Full Moon Fever, released in 1989. "Trailer" was later re-recorded and released in May 2016 by Petty's other band Mudcrutch, on its second studio album, 2. "Walkin' from the Fire" was eventually released on the posthumous box set An American Treasure in 2018. The song "My Life/Your World" from Let Me Up (I've Had Enough) included several of the song's lyrics rewritten.

While mixing the album's opening track, "Rebels", Petty became frustrated and punched a wall, severely breaking his left hand. Subsequent surgery on his hand left him with several pins, wires and screws holding his hand together.

The album cover features an 1865 painting by Winslow Homer titled The Veteran in a New Field.

The album would prove to be the last album to have any involvement of bassist Ron Blair until 2002, with Blair featuring on the track "The Best of Everything". A new version of the song with a different arrangement and a previously unreleased verse was released as a single in 2018, before the release of the upcoming eponymous compilation album.

Critical reception 
In a three-out-of-five star review, Stephen Thomas Erlewine of AllMusic commented that while "occasionally, the songs work" and "Don't Come Around Here No More" and "Make It Better (Forget About Me)" expand [the band's] sound nicely", the record was too often "weighed down by its own ambitions".

In the Los Angeles Review of Books, Connor Goodwin said the album is "deeply embedded in nostalgia for the Lost Cause."

Track listing

Personnel
Tom Petty and the Heartbreakers
Tom Petty – lead vocals (all tracks), electric guitar (tracks 2, 9), acoustic guitar (track 6), 12-string guitar (1, 7), tambourine (track 2), piano (tracks 3-4), OBX drum machine (track 8)
Mike Campbell – electric guitar (tracks 1-3, 5, 7, 8-9), Dobro (track 4), slide guitar (track 6), bass guitar (track 1), keyboards (tracks 1-3), piano (track 8), backing vocals (track 2)
 Benmont Tench – keyboards (tracks 1, 3, 5, 7, 9), piano (tracks 2, 4), electric piano (track 6), vibraphone (track 8), backing vocals (track 1)
Howie Epstein – bass guitar (tracks 3, 5, 6-8), backing vocals (tracks 1-3, 7, 8), harmony vocals (4, 6, 8)
Stan Lynch – drums (all tracks), percussion (tracks 3-4, 8), backing vocals (track 1)

Additional musicians
 David A. Stewart – bass guitar (track 2), electric guitar (tracks 2, 5), backing vocals (tracks 2,3), sitar (track 3), keyboards (track 3)
 Bobbye Hall – tambourine (tracks 1, 7)
 The Heart Attack Horns - horns (tracks 1, 7)
 Malcolm 'Molly' Duncan – saxophone (tracks 1, 5)
 Greg Smith – baritone saxophone (track 2)
 William Bergman – tenor saxophone (track 2)
 John Berry Jr. – horns (track 2)
 Rick Braun – trumpet (track 2)
 Jim Coile – tenor saxophone (track 2)
 Marilyn Martin – backing vocals (track 3)
 Daniel Rothmuller - cello (track 3)
 Sharon Celani – backing vocals (track 3)
 Dean Garcia – bass guitar (track 3)
 Jack Nitzsche - string arrangement (track 4)
 Clydene Jackson – backing vocals (track 5)
 Phil Jones – tambourine (track 5)
 Dave Plews – trumpet (track 5)
 Stephanie Spruill – backing vocals (track 5)
 Julia Tillman Waters – backing vocals (track 5)
 Maxine Willard Waters – backing vocals (track 5)
 Marty Jourard – saxophones (track 8)
 Jerry Hey – horn conductor (track 9)
 Garth Hudson – keyboards (track 9)
 Jim Keltner – percussion (track 9)
 Richard Manuel – harmony vocals (track 9)
 Ron Blair – bass guitar (track 9)

Production
 David Bianco – engineer
 Steve Breitborde – photography
 Mike Campbell - producer
 Joel Fein – engineer
 Winslow Homer – artwork, cover painting
 Jimmy Iovine – producer
 Dennis Keeley – photography
 Stephen Marcussen – mastering
 Tom Petty - producer
 Robbie Robertson – producer
 Don Smith – engineer, remixing
 Steele Works – design, cover design
 Tommy Steele – art direction, design, cover design
 David A. Stewart - producer
 Alan "Bugs" Weidel – engineer
 Shelly Yakus – engineer, remixing

Charts

Weekly charts

Singles

Notes 

1985 albums
Tom Petty albums
Albums produced by Tom Petty
Albums produced by Jimmy Iovine
Albums produced by David A. Stewart
MCA Records albums
Albums recorded at Sunset Sound Recorders
Lost Cause of the Confederacy
Concept albums